In probability and statistics, the Gamma/Gompertz distribution is a continuous probability distribution. It has been used as an aggregate-level model of customer lifetime and a model of mortality risks.

Specification

Probability density function

The probability density function of the Gamma/Gompertz distribution is:

Cumulative distribution function

The cumulative distribution function of the Gamma/Gompertz distribution is:

Moment generating function
The moment generating function is given by:

where  is a Hypergeometric function.

Properties 
The Gamma/Gompertz distribution is a flexible distribution that can be skewed to the right or to the left.

Related distributions 
When β = 1, this reduces to an Exponential distribution with parameter sb.
The gamma distribution is a natural conjugate prior to a Gompertz likelihood with known, scale parameter 

See also 
Gompertz distribution
Customer lifetime value

Notes

References

Continuous distributions

hu:Gompertz-eloszlás